Andi Jemma Airport  is an airport near Masamba, the capital city of North Luwu Regency in the province of South Sulawesi on the island of Sulawesi in Indonesia.

Facilities

Since August 2014, the service was left to an SOE in charge of the management of several airports in eastern Indonesia, namely PT. Angkasa Pura 1 (Persero) and the Government of North Luwu Regency (begins division in August 2014).

Airlines and destinations

Accidents and incidents
 On 2 October 2015, an Aviastar DHC-6 Twin Otter, registered as PK-BRM, operating Aviastar Flight 7503 with three crew members and seven passengers on board, crashed near Palopo 11 minutes after takeoff. The flight was taking off from Andi Jemma Airport, and its destination was Makassar. The passengers were four adults, two children, and a baby. There were no survivors.

References

Airports in South Sulawesi